Ford Motor Company Cincinnati Plant is a registered historic building in Cincinnati, Ohio, listed in the National Register on May 25, 1989.

The former manufacturing plant was transformed in 2002 into office space. As of 2017, the building is owned by Cincinnati Children's.

See also

Ford Motor Company

Notes 

Ford factories
Motor vehicle assembly plants in Ohio
National Register of Historic Places in Cincinnati
Office buildings in Cincinnati
Motor vehicle manufacturing plants on the National Register of Historic Places
Transportation buildings and structures on the National Register of Historic Places in Ohio
Industrial buildings and structures on the National Register of Historic Places in Ohio
Chicago school architecture in Ohio